Ammann & Whitney was a full-service Civil engineering firm that provided design and construction services for public and private sector projects. The firm provided new construction, renovations, adaptive reuse, historic preservation, interior design and sustainable design.

In 2016, Ammann & Whitney merged with Louis Berger to form Louis Berger U.S.

History
Ammann & Whitney was founded in 1946 by Othmar Ammann, a bridge designer, and Charles S. Whitney, a designer of innovative structures.  Whitney's innovations include collaborations with Eero Saarinen on early thin-shell concrete structures such as Kresge Auditorium (1955), TWA Flight Center (1962), and the main terminal at Dulles International Airport (1962).

Ammann & Whitney has since grown into an international firm.  While working with a wide variety of projects including (steel, concrete, masonry and timber) bridges for vehicular, pedestrian and rail traffic, Ammann & Whitney focuses on long span suspension bridges.  Examples of the firm's bridge work include the Delaware Memorial Bridge, Walt Whitman Bridge, the General Belgrano Bridge in Argentina, the Throgs Neck Bridge and most notably the Verrazano-Narrows Bridge.

In July 2016, Ammann & Whitney merged with Louis Berger. It is now Berger's long-span bridge division.

Ammann & Whitney currently has offices on the East Coast of the United States and its headquarters in New York City.  There are branch offices in Boston, MA, Philadelphia, PA, Pittsburgh, PA, Richmond, VA, Miami, FL,  and Washington, D.C.

Bridge and Highway Projects
New York City
Bronx-Whitestone Bridge
Throgs Neck Bridge
Triborough Bridge
Verrazzano-Narrows Bridge
Wards Island Bridge
George Washington Bridge
Williamsburg Bridge
Elsewhere
Bear Mountain Bridge, upstate New York
General Belgrano Bridge, Argentina
Bridge of the Americas, Panama
Delaware Memorial Bridge between Delaware and New Jersey
Benjamin Franklin Bridge, Philadelphia
Golden Gate Bridge, San Francisco
Thomas J. Hatem Memorial Bridge, northeastern Maryland
Huguenot Bridge, Richmond, Virginia
Mon/Fayette Expressway, Pittsburgh vicinity
Roebling Suspension Bridge, between Cincinnati, Ohio, and Covington, Kentucky
Royal Gorge Bridge, Colorado
Tobin Bridge, Boston, Massachusetts

Projects
Ammann & Whitney projects included:
Arecibo Radio Telescope, Puerto Rico
Dulles International Airport Terminal Buildings
TWA Terminal at JFK International Airport
Kresge Auditorium
Queens Museum of Art
Metropolitan Opera House

References

External links

Construction and civil engineering companies established in 1946
Engineering companies of the United States
1946 establishments in the United States
Design companies disestablished in 2016
2016 disestablishments in the United States